Zhao Xiaoli may refer to:
 Zhao Xiaoli (canoeist)
 Zhao Xiaoli (actress)